Heavy Metal Fruit is the fourteenth full-length studio album by the Norwegian band Motorpsycho, released on January 18, 2010, via Rune Grammofon and Stickman Records. It was released on CD and vinyl and is their third album over the course of the last two years.

Track listing
 Starhammer (feat. The Electric Psalmon) (12:57)
 X-3 (Knuckleheads In Space) / The Getaway Special (9:03)
 The Bomb-Proof Roll and Beyond (for Arnie Hassle) (6:01)
 Close Your Eyes (3:39)
 W.B.A.T. (9:43)
 Gullible's Travails (pt. I - IV) (20:42)
I. Eye All-Seeing
II. The Elementhaler
III. Circle
IV. Phoot's Flower (a Burly Return)

Tracks 1, 3 & 6 by Ryan/Sæther
Tracks 4 & 5 by Sæther
Track 2 by Kapstad/Ryan/Sæther

Personnel
Bent Sæther – vocals, bass, guitars, keyboards
Hans Magnus Ryan – vocals, guitars, keyboards
Kenneth Kapstad – drums

with:
Mathias Eick – trumpet on track 2
Hanne Hukkelberg – vocals on tracks 2/4/5/6
Kåre Vestrheim – keyboards

References

2010 albums
Motorpsycho albums